The Journal of Experimental Criminology is a quarterly peer-reviewed academic journal covering experimental research in the field of criminology. It was established in 2005 with David Weisburd of George Mason University as the founding editor-in-chief, and the current editor-in-chief is Lorraine Mazerolle (University of Queensland). It is published by Springer Science+Business Media, and is sponsored by the Academy of Experimental Criminology. According to the Journal Citation Reports, the journal has a 2014 impact factor of 1.167.

References

External links

Criminology journals
Quarterly journals
Springer Science+Business Media academic journals
Publications established in 2005
English-language journals